Cold Eyes (lit. "Stakeout" or "Surveillance") is a 2013 South Korean  action thriller film starring Sol Kyung-gu, Jung Woo-sung, and Han Hyo-joo. A remake of the 2007 Hong Kong film Eye in the Sky, Cold Eyes is about detectives from the surveillance team of a special crime unit who work together to track down a highly efficient and dangerous robber and the crew he leads.

It made its North American premiere at the 2013 Toronto International Film Festival, and also screened at the 2013 Busan International Film Festival in the Open Cinema section.

Plot
After a job interview, Ha Yoon-joo, a woman with photographic memory gets hired by a police division where she meets members who to her surprise are largely unarmed and don't wear uniforms, as they specialize in surveillance rather than policing. She joins a team led by a man named Hwang, the division avoids arresting criminals and focuses exclusively on following them around to gather information. The surveillance team immediately runs into trouble when they can't identify a particular ring of robbers due to their masks and their efficiency in robbing the bank. In response, Hwang, Ha, and six other officers spend several weeks wandering around the city streets, tagging after people who match the criminal's physical description. When they finally find him, they put cameras outside his apartment.

Meanwhile, James, the leader of the criminals, wishes to quit his line of work, but his elderly mentor responds by sending a man to kill him, whom he successfully defends against. When James's subordinates confer to discuss the next mission, they are successfully tracked by Hwang's officers who call in a SWAT team to subdue them. James, who was standing in a separate location, finds it necessary to murder one of Hwang's officers to escape. Later, after James is given criticism from the mentor, he attacks the mentor's hide-out, murdering the mentor and his body-guards. He then acquires a fake Thai passport and gets ready to leave South Korea.

Hwang and Ha both feel sad at the death of their colleague. As a result, Hwang announces his resignation while Ha takes a leave of absence. However, while Ha is doing her laundry, she suddenly remembers using her good memory that she had randomly run into James in the past. Namely, on the day of her police interview, James had fleetingly walked past her inside a subway car, carrying a grocery store brochure. Ha runs to the grocery store and waits there, managing to catch sight of James again, and urgently notifies Hwang and his officers while staying on James's tail. When James walks into a tunnel, Hwang takes over the pursuit, but James recognizes Hwang (he had seen him in the mirror earlier when he was being followed) and stabs him. Luckily, though, the wound isn't fatal. Ha continues the pursuit into the subway tunnels but this time she is also recognized by James and eventually held hostage. When the SWAT team comes down to the subway tunnel, James lets go of Ha but escapes and runs deeper into the tunnels.

As the chase goes on, James finds himself trapped between the advancing SWAT team and the mouth of the tunnel, which is being guarded by Hwang, who ran the long way around. As James decides to charge at Hwang, the latter, finding himself at the juncture of an oncoming train, stands his ground to shoot at James, risking a 50/50 chance that the train will flatten him. Fortunately, the train takes the other branch and James is hit by Hwang's revolver and killed.

Encouraged by the success, Hwang withdraws his resignation, and together with Ha, goes on to execute further such missions including the pursuit of an international terrorist.

Cast

Main
Sol Kyung-gu as Chief detective Hwang
Jung Woo-sung as James, leader of an international crime ring     
Han Hyo-joo as rookie detective Ha Yoon-joo

Supporting
Jin Kyung as Department head Lee 
Lee Jun-ho as Detective Daramjwi ("Squirrel") 
Kim Byeong-ok as mysterious broker/cobbler
Simon Yam as target of surveillance team (cameo)
Byun Yo-han as M3
Lee Dong-hwi as Parrot

Box office
Cold Eyes smashed 2.17 million in the first week of release. After 17 days, it reached 4 million admissions. It reached the 5 million mark on July 27, with 5,506,409 total admissions at the end of its run.

Awards and nominations
2013 Buil Film Awards
 Best Actress - Han Hyo-joo
 Nominated - Best Supporting Actress - Jin Kyung
 Nominated - Best New Actor - Lee Jun-ho
 Nominated - Best Screenplay - Cho Ui-seok
 Nominated - Best Cinematography - Kim Byeong-seo

2013 Korean Association of Film Critics Awards
 Nominated - Best Actress - Han Hyo-joo

2013 Grand Bell Awards
 Nominated - Best Costume Design - Jo Sang-gyeong

2013 Blue Dragon Film Awards
 Best Actress - Han Hyo-joo 
 Nominated - Best Supporting Actor - Jung Woo-sung
 Nominated - Best Cinematography - Kim Byeong-seo, Yeo Kyung-bo
 Nominated - Best Lighting - Kim Seung-gyu
 Nominated - Best Music - Dalparan, Jang Young-gyu
 Nominated - Technical Award - Shin Min-kyung

2013 Asia Pacific Film Festival
 Nominated - Best Editing - Shin Min-kyung

2014 Asian Film Awards 
 Best Editor - Shin Min-kyung
 Nominated - Best Actress - Han Hyo-joo
 Nominated - Best Supporting Actor - Jung Woo-sung
 Nominated - Best Cinematography - Kim Byeong-seo, Yeo Kyung-bo

2014 Baeksang Arts Awards
 Best Supporting Actress - Jin Kyung
 Nominated - Best Director - Cho Ui-seok, Kim Byeong-seo
 Nominated - Best Actor - Jung Woo-sung
 Nominated - Most Popular Actor (Film) - Jung Woo-sung
 Nominated - Most Popular Actress (Film) - Han Hyo-joo

See also
List of films featuring surveillance

References

External links
 
 
 
 

2013 films
2013 action thriller films
2013 crime action films
South Korean action thriller films
South Korean crime action films
Films about security and surveillance
Films about police officers
South Korean remakes of foreign films
Remakes of Hong Kong films
Next Entertainment World films
2010s South Korean films